The word Maní may refer to:

Geography:
 Maní, Yucatán, a small city in Yucatán, Mexico.
 Maní, Casanare a town and municipality in Casanare Department, Colombia.

Other:
 Maní, an Indian girl whose legend leads to the cult of Manioc.
 Juego de maní, an Afro-Cuban martial art/dance similar to Capoeira.
 Maní, a Spanish word for peanut.